Spyridium fontis-woodii, commonly known as Woods Well spyridium, is a species of flowering plant in the family Rhamnaceae and is endemic to a small area of Coorong National Park in South Australia. It is a slender shrub with softly-hairy young stems, broadly egg-shaped to broadly heart-shaped leaves with the narrower end towards the base, and head of white to cream-coloured flowers.

Description
The leaves are covered with white to greyish hairs, densely so on the lower surface.

Taxonomy
Spyridium fontis-woodii was first formally described in 2012 by Jürgen Kellermann and William Barker in the journal Muelleria from specimens collected near Woods Well in Coorong National Park in 1995. The specific epithet (fontis-woodii) is a reference to the type location, fons being a Latin word meaning "well" or "spring".

Distribution
This species of Spyridium grows in open shrubland on partly-exposed limestone, and is endemic to an area near Woods Well in the Coorong National Park in South Australia.

Conservation status
This species is listed as "critically endangered" under the Australian Government Environment Protection and Biodiversity Conservation Act 1999. The main threats to the species include clearance of native vegetation, road maintenance, browsing by rabbits and hares, and weed invasion.

References

fontis-woodii
Rosales of Australia
Flora of South Australia
Plants described in 2012
Taxa named by William Robert Barker